Run of the Mill may refer to:

"Run of the Mill" (George Harrison song), 1970 song by George Harrison
"Run of the Mill" (Judas Priest song), 1974 song by Judas Priest

See also
Wikipedia:Run-of-the-mill